Ranko Popović (born 26 June 1967) is a Serbian football manager and former player.  He was most recently the manager of Japanese club Machida Zelvia.

Playing career
Born in Peć, SAP Kosovo, SR Serbia, Popović started out at local club Budućnost. He moved to Belgrade in 1985 due to compulsory military service and played for Kneževac in the Belgrade Zone League. In the 1988–89 season, Popović played for fellow Belgrade Zone League club Beograd.

In the summer of 1989, Popović was acquired by Yugoslav First League side Partizan. He was later loaned to Yugoslav Second League club Leotar during the 1989–90 season. After returning to Partizan, Popović made two appearances in the 1990–91 Yugoslav First League.

In 1992, Popović switched to Spartak Subotica. He spent two and a half years there, before moving abroad to Greece and joining Ethnikos Piraeus in the summer of 1994. Six months later, Popović returned to Spartak Subotica until the end of the season.

After playing for two years at Segunda División club Almería, Popović joined Austrian side Sturm Graz in the summer of 1997, aged 30. He spent the next four seasons with the club, winning back-to-back championships in 1998 and 1999. In addition, Popović made 11 appearances in the UEFA Champions League.

Managerial career

Austria and Japan
Between 2002 and 2006, Popović served as player-manager of Austrian lower league sides TuS FC Arnfels and SV Pachern. He subsequently moved to Japan in the summer of 2006, assisting his compatriot Mihailo Petrović at Sanfrecce Hiroshima for over a year.

Serbia
In early 2008, Popović returned to his homeland and took charge of Serbian League Vojvodina club Zlatibor Voda. He led them to promotion to the Serbian First League, before they merged with Spartak Subotica. In May 2009, Popović was replaced by Slavko Vojičić.

Return to Japan

In July 2009, Popović accepted an offer to coach J League club Oita Trinita, which had experienced 14 consecutive defeats in the season. In his first six matches, the team only won once, but in the last 10 matches of the season, it did not lose once (five wins and five draws). This result earned him an offer to coach the team for the next season, but the team nearly went bankrupt and his contract had to be canceled.

In December 2010, Popović was appointed manager of Machida Zelvia. He subsequently went on to become manager of some of the most recognized clubs in Japan, including FC Tokyo and Cerezo Osaka.

Spain
On 24 November 2014, Popović was appointed at the helm of Spanish Segunda División side Zaragoza, replacing the fired Víctor Muñoz. He led the team to the 2015 Segunda División play-offs, but fell short, losing to Las Palmas on the away goals rule. While at Zaragoza, Popović was named the Segunda División Manager of the Month by the LFP in October 2015. He was dismissed on 20 December 2015, after a 3–1 loss against Gimnàstic.

Thailand and India
In August 2016, Thai League club Buriram United appointed Popović as the club manager to fill the vacant role after the dismissal of Afshin Ghotbi. He left the position in June 2017 after receiving a three-month ban by the Thai FA (FAT) for slapping his team's physio after a league game earlier that month.

In September 2017, Indian Super League side Pune City appointed Popović as new manager. He parted ways with the club in May 2018.

Personal life
Popović also holds Austrian citizenship.

Managerial statistics

Honours

Player
Sturm Graz
 Austrian Bundesliga: 1997–98, 1998–99
 Austrian Cup: 1998–99
 Austrian Supercup: 1998, 1999

Manager
Zlatibor Voda
 Serbian League Vojvodina: 2007–08
Buriram United
 Thai League Cup: 2016
 Mekong Club Championship: 2016

References

External links

 
 
 

Association football defenders
Austrian Football Bundesliga managers
Austrian Football Bundesliga players
Ranko Popovic
Cerezo Osaka managers
Ethnikos Piraeus F.C. players
Expatriate football managers in Austria
Expatriate football managers in India
Expatriate football managers in Japan
Expatriate football managers in Spain
Expatriate football managers in Thailand
Expatriate footballers in Austria
Expatriate footballers in Greece
Expatriate footballers in Spain
FC Machida Zelvia managers
FC Pune City managers
FC Tokyo managers
First League of Serbia and Montenegro players
FK Beograd players
FK Leotar players
FK Partizan players
FK Spartak Subotica managers
FK Spartak Subotica players
J1 League managers
J2 League managers
Kosovo Serbs
Naturalised citizens of Austria
Oita Trinita managers
Sportspeople from Peja
Real Zaragoza managers
Segunda División managers
Segunda División players
Serbia and Montenegro expatriate footballers
Serbia and Montenegro expatriate sportspeople in Austria
Serbia and Montenegro expatriate sportspeople in Greece
Serbia and Montenegro expatriate sportspeople in Spain
Serbia and Montenegro footballers
Serbian expatriate football managers
Serbian expatriate sportspeople in Austria
Serbian expatriate sportspeople in India
Serbian expatriate sportspeople in Japan
Serbian expatriate sportspeople in Spain
Serbian expatriate sportspeople in Thailand
Serbian football managers
Serbian footballers
SK Sturm Graz players
SKN St. Pölten managers
UD Almería players
Yugoslav First League players
Yugoslav footballers
1967 births
Living people